Charles Kimball Fletcher (December 15, 1902 – September 29, 1985) was an American banker and Republican politician from San Diego, California.

Early life
Fletcher was born 1902 to "Colonel" Ed Fletcher and Mary C. Fletcher in San Diego and graduated from San Diego High School where he set several swimming records, including an unofficial world record time in the 220 yard breaststroke. Fletcher went on to Stanford University, where he was captain of the school's water polo team, which won the national championship in 1924, the year he graduated. He is a member of both the Stanford Athletic Hall of Fame and the San Diego Hall of Champions.

Fletcher also attended Pembroke College, Oxford University, England, in 1934.

Business career
After graduation, he went into the savings and loan business. He founded Home Federal Savings and Loan Association in 1934, serving as its president until 1959 when he became chairman of the board of directors.

During World War II, Fletcher served as a lieutenant with the United States Naval Reserve from 1943 to 1945. He served as a member of California Commission on Correctional Facilities and Services from 1955 to 1957.

Political career
Fletcher was elected to the 80th United States Congress, serving one term from 1947–1949. He lost his bid for reelection in 1948.

Personal life
Fletcher married Jeannette Toberman, the daughter of "Mr. Hollywood" Charles E. Toberman in 1926. The couple's son, Charles K. "Kim" Jr., was chair of Home Federal. They also had another son and daughter: Peter and Dale. They lived in San Diego until his death from cancer in 1985.
He was cremated and the ashes were scattered off the coast of Del Mar, California.

References

External links
 Biography of Father, Col. Ed Fletcher (San Diego Historical Society). Based on biography in Carl Heilbron's History of San Diego County (1936). Archive.org URL.

1902 births
1985 deaths
Politicians from San Diego
American male breaststroke swimmers
American Congregationalists
Alumni of Pembroke College, Oxford
Stanford Cardinal men's water polo players
Republican Party members of the United States House of Representatives from California
20th-century American politicians
San Diego High School alumni